Tastes Like Gold is the seventh studio album by the American rock band Lit. It is the band's first album with drummer Taylor Carroll.

Track listing

Personnel
Lit
 A. Jay Popoff – lead vocals
 Jeremy Popoff – guitar, backing vocals
 Kevin Baldes – bass, backing vocals
 Taylor Carroll – drums (all except 2, 10)

Additional musicians
 Carlo Colasacco – guitar, keyboards, programming, backing vocals, production
 Youthyear (Eric Paquette) – guitar, keyboards, programming, backing vocals, production
 Adrian Young – drums (2)
 Jeff Lynch – backing vocals (4)
 Zac Barnett – backing vocals (6)
 Matt Sanchez – backing vocals (6)
 Jim "Moose" Brown – keyboards (7, 10)
 Rich Redmond – drums (10)
 Ryan Gillmor – guitar (12)
 Sean Holland – guitar (12)
 Jason Freese – keyboards (12)
 Butch Walker – co-lead vocals (12)

References

2021 albums
Lit (band) albums